Woman Without a Past is a 1939 German drama film directed by Nunzio Malasomma and starring Sybille Schmitz, Albrecht Schoenhals, and Maria von Tasnady.

The film's sets were designed by the art director Hans Ledersteger.

Main cast

References

Bibliography

External links 
 

1939 films
Films of Nazi Germany
German drama films
1939 drama films
1930s German-language films
Films directed by Nunzio Malasomma
Films about amnesia
German black-and-white films
1930s German films